The Bangerz Tour was the fourth concert tour by American singer Miley Cyrus. It was held in support of her fourth studio album, Bangerz (2013). The tour visited the Americas, Europe, and Oceania through five legs. It spanned from February 14 to October 23, 2014. Cyrus performed all songs from the album excluding "Hands in the Air", among covers of songs by other artists. Cyrus' allergic reaction along with logistical issues led to three cancellations in the tour's scheduled dates. A show in Santo Domingo, Dominican Republic was banned by the government citing moral grounds.

The tour was noted for its sexual imagery. Described as "campy", "surreal", and "raunchy", it received predominantly favorable reviews from critics, who praised Cyrus' stage presence, vocals, originality, and self-mockery. It was the 16th highest-grossing tour of 2014, earning $62.9 million. Footage from the shows at Barcelona and Lisbon was filmed, airing on NBC on July 6, 2014. It was then released on DVD and Blu-ray on March 24, 2015.

Background and development 

In 2012, Cyrus announced plans to focus on her film career, effectively putting her musical endeavors on hiatus. That year, she appeared in the films LOL and So Undercover. She was also confirmed as a primary voice actress in the feature film Hotel Transylvania, but dropped out of the project to coordinate a musical comeback. In January 2013, Cyrus ended her recording contract with Hollywood Records, under which she released the studio albums Meet Miley Cyrus (2007), Breakout (2008), Can't Be Tamed (2010), and EP The Time of Our Lives (2009). Later that month, she signed a recording contract with RCA Records. In March, she confirmed that her fourth studio album would be released by the end of 2013.

The final product, Bangerz, was released on October 4, 2013. At Metacritic, which assigns a normalized rating out of 100 to reviews from mainstream critics, the album received an average score of 61, which indicates "generally favorable reviews", based on 21 reviews. It debuted at number one on the U.S. Billboard 200, having moved 270,000 units, and charted strongly in several countries worldwide. During her appearance on Today on October 7, Cyrus first mentioned her intentions to tour in 2014. On October 26, she made a surprise appearance on another episode of Saturday Night Live to officially announce the Bangerz Tour. Claire Atkinson from the New York Post reported that concert promoters Live Nation Entertainment and AEG Live engaged in much competition to promote the tour, with the former ultimately being selected to represent the North American leg after agreeing to pay Cyrus $500,000 per presentation.

On November 11, a series of three promotional videos were released to YouTube to promote the Bangerz Tour. Cyrus originally announced that The Blonds and Kenzo were enlisted as costume designers in December, although Roberto Cavalli was later confirmed for the position after six sketches of costume designs were released in January 2014. Cyrus began rehearsals later that month, at which time John Kricfalusi, creator of The Ren & Stimpy Show, was enlisted to create artwork and animation for the tour.

During a teleconference on July 30, 2014, Cyrus stated that the goal of the tour was to make something that was "really fun", "real" and had a "good energy about it". She further stated- "I think the best thing for an artist is to see people sing along to your songs, and also to have people participating in your show... this show is a really hard show to not want to get up and be involved... there's a feminist energy there, and if people enjoy taking a chance and coming to a show that's different, I really appreciate that. I hope my fans are kind of inspired by my show to take it to the next level."

Opening acts 
The three main opening acts of the tour were Icona Pop, Sky Ferreira and Lily Allen. Icona Pop praised Cyrus – "She's crazy and she's fun but that's her expressing herself on stage and in her music. But she's really a smart woman and everything on stage was her idea. She's the boss of everything and it's just very inspiring to be around someone who's having a lot of fun because she's doing stuff her way and with her friends and her crew, but in a very professional way." Ferreira stated – "I really like when she does the acoustic set [in her show]. I think that's kind of the biggest fuck-you to everyone who's talked shit about her, because she has a really great voice. The whole show kind of shows everyone up. No one can deny it." Allen praised Cyrus and the tour, stating – "I saw it at the O2 in London [in May], and I'm not exaggerating when I say it's one of the best shows that I've seen in years... It's up there with an Oasis show or The Stone Roses or something. It's kind of incredible to watch – she's a real force. There's no two ways about it, she's meant to be up there doing that." She also added that the Bangerz tour stage production was "impressive", but even without the bells and whistles, Cyrus would have been able to pull off an "unforgettable pop experience."

Concert synopsis 

The tour commenced with a close-up of Cyrus' face on the video screen while her dancers appeared on stage. Cyrus, in a red leotard, entered the stage from a slide that appeared where her tongue would be located; and performed "SMS (Bangerz)", joined by people dressed as furries and cartoon characters while an animation by John Kricfalusi, creator of The Ren and Stimpy Show, plays on screen. "4x4" followed with Cyrus' dancers dressed as chickens. Following a brief outfit change to a green marijuana-inspired outfit, she re-appeared singing "Love Money Party" on a golden car (a 1983 Chevrolet Monte Carlo SS modified in the style of a donk) before a larger-than-life-size puppet of Big Sean was unveiled to rap his verse. Cyrus later jumped off the car as it was driving up the stage and threw counterfeit money featuring her face into the audience.

Afterwards "My Darlin'" and "Maybe You're Right" were performed. Cyrus went backstage and changed into a red latex outfit to perform "FU" and a country version of "Do My Thang". Next, Cyrus sang "Get It Right" while pictures of candy representing female genitalia were shown on the video screen. The next act began with Cyrus, in a black and white feathered outfit, performing "Can't Be Tamed", accompanied by an inflatable replica of her late dog Floyd. Following this performance, Cyrus left for a quick change, while a video featuring an animated Cyrus on a jet ski was shown on the video screen. A kiss cam appeared as Cyrus returned to stage and sang "Adore You". During the performance of "Drive", Cyrus prompted the audience to put their flashlights on their phones on and wave them while blue lasers were displayed from under the stage.

During an outfit change, a black and white video interlude of a partially dressed Cyrus making several poses while wearing sexual bondage, with the track "Fitzpleasure" by Alt-J playing in the background was shown on the video screen. However, after May 1, a short film called "Miley Cyrus: Tongue Tied", playing 30s' "Stockholm Syndrome" featuring Zoe, played instead. Cyrus then appeared on a smaller stage at the back of the arena in an oversized shirt with her face on it for a performance of "Rooting for My Baby". She then performed covers of "Hey Ya!" by Outkast and "Jolene" by Dolly Parton. After exiting the B stage, an unreleased track titled "Pretty Girls (Fun)" played while the LA Bakers appeared on the main stage dancing and twerking to the song. Cyrus then re-appeared on the main stage for a performance of "23" by Mike Will Made It (in which Cyrus was a featured artist). Cyrus then had a brief outfit change before performing "On My Own" where she was surrounded by her dancers dressed as colorful animals, and "Someone Else" where she rode a flying hot dog above the audience. Following this, she re-appeared in a white leotard to perform "We Can't Stop" and "Wrecking Ball" followed with dark blue lasers being projected from behind the video screen. For the encore she came back on stage in an American themed outfit wearing a short blonde wig and a cowboy hat for the performance of "Party in the U.S.A." while some of her dancers were dressed as the Statue of Liberty, Abraham Lincoln, the Liberty Bell and Mount Rushmore. Cyrus then said her goodbyes to the audience and exited the stage while fireworks were shot into the sky with elements of the United States National Anthem playing in the background.

Critical reception 
After Cyrus' premiere performance, the Bangerz Tour received praise from critics. Victoria Pavlova from Contact Music spoke favorably of Cyrus' stage presence and wardrobe, and stated that her entrance was "enough to recommend the show right there." Mike Wass from Idolator described the performance as being "weird and wonderful" and jokingly called it the musical version of the film Spring Breakers (2012). He appreciated that she "[owned] all her headline-grabbing antics from 2013 (the twerking, that foam finger and those skimpy outfits)" and mainly performed tracks from Bangerz, although he was more critical of her vocal delivery during the slower tracks and the inclusion of "filler" songs, which he felt "[didn't] quite cut it." Writing for Rolling Stone, Denise Sheppard noted that "the fact that there really wasn't anything jaw-droppingly shocking about the entire night" was the most unexpected component of the concert, and felt that Cyrus achieved her goal of being viewed as a legitimate singer instead of primarily receiving attention for her controversial behavior. She also opined that "her taste in other people's music is quite impressive", commending the uses of "Fitzpleasure", "Jolene", and "Hey Ya!".

Jane Stevenson from the Toronto Sun praised Cyrus' performance, writing, "Cyrus seemed dead serious about having some very colorful fun for two hours. She opened her show sliding down a giant pink tongue extended from her gaping mouth on an enormous video screen that showed her pretty face in all its blue-eyed, blond-cropped hair glory... It was a real spectacle." Shawn Conner from USA Today wrote that Cyrus' performance proved that "the time has come to move the conversation [...] beyond the notorious move she pulled on Robin Thicke at last year's MTV Video Music Awards"; he spoke favorably of the on-screen visuals seen alongside Cyrus and appreciated that she did not lip sync along pre-recorded tracks. Conner also opined that "Cyrus has the charisma and maybe the smarts to be the post-Madonna Madonna", and added that she appeared to be "approachable, on- and off-stage, in a way that Madonna never did."

However, in a more mixed review, François Marchand from The Vancouver Sun provided a more negative review; he suggested that Cyrus was "a pop artist in a shiny, attention-grabbing wrapper", and that the performance was neither "the evolution of pop, female empowerment, [or] mindless fun", but rather "capitalism at work". Sam Lansky writing for Time magazine praised the singer's performance in Brooklyn calling her one of the "most dynamic performers of her generation." Adam Graham from The Detroit News gave a positive review of the performance in Auburn, writing the show "is like a blast of confetti to the face, a dizzying, non-stop party that leaves you reeling and questioning what you just saw."

On July 30, 2014, John J. Moser of The Morning Call included the tour in his list of Top 3 Concerts alongside tours by Billy Joel and Katy Perry stating "...Miley shockers these days are about her topless desert photos and cameo in Pharrell's newest video. That doesn't mean the show's not still worth seeing." Glenn Gamboa of the Newsday praised the show and Cyrus' vocals, writing "...She then proceeded to take on Bob Dylan's "You’re Gonna Make Me Lonesome When You Go", The Smiths’ "There Is a Light That Never Goes Out", Lana Del Rey's "Summertime Sadness" and Dolly Parton's "Jolene" with no special effects or choreographed moves – just her powerful voice. That she can get an arena filled with teens and young adults to sing along with Dolly Parton's country hit from 1973 speaks to the power of Cyrus. And, for the most part, during this version of the Bangerz tour, she uses that power for good." Kelly Roncace of the South Jersey Times reviewed the show positively, writing, "While Miley has been surrounded by some controversy since her transformation from child star to a less inhibited adult performer, the artist's raw talent and ability to entertain was evident from the first note of the show to the last."

Dan DeLuca of The Philadelphia Inquirer, also gave a positive review, writing, "... she was straightforward and serious minded when it came to augmenting her own material – she performed all of Bangerz, plus two older hits, "Can't Be Tamed" and "Party in the U.S.A." – with a selection of covers designed to challenge herself. The show is also funny, and doesn't come off as pre-programmed and scripted as most over the top arena spectacles... that unpredictable eclecticism is just a broad stroke representation of the new genre-jumping normal, and it's from some combination of those elements that Cyrus will become a new Someone Else." Scott Mervis of the Pittsburgh Post-Gazette praised the show and Cyrus' vocals, calling it an "over-the-top dance-pop extravaganza with a wacky sense of humor, artful musical gestures and a big-voiced playful star who seemed thrilled to be there." Théoden Janes of The Charlotte Observer praised the show, writing, "Beneath all the audaciousness was a fair amount of awesomeness. Cyrus didn’t lip-synch a word. Her voice was both flexible and appropriately raw.  Throughout, she managed to come across as gracious and accessible, bantering with fans and accepting pretty much any gift that came her way."

Chris Talbott of the Star Tribune provided a positive review, opining that Cyrus showed her growing prowess as an entertainer during the show. He also praised Cyrus' vocal delivery and called the show a "real spectacle." A critic from the Nashville Scene praised the show and Cyrus' strong vocal delivery. He further commented on the show's theme, writing, "It was an impressive pop-culture aggregation and the entire production was like a party scene from an over-serious 90s movie about a future dystopia...The thing about Miley Cyrus is that she's a genuinely beautiful woman unafraid of making herself look like a total goober: it's hard not to be charmed by that." Blake Hannon provided a positive review, praising Cyrus' powerful vocal delivery and calling the show a "campy, cartoonishly over-the-top spectacle and musical showcase that was unforgettable... You can't help but admire (or scratch your head at) the girl's go-big-or-go-home approach." Kevin C. Johnson of St. Louis Post-Dispatch provided a favorable review, praising Cyrus' "solid and consistent" vocal delivery and calling the show a "silly and entertaining spectacle."

NBC television special 
During her performance in Barcelona, Spain, Cyrus announced that footage from the concert was being filmed for a special to be broadcast by NBC. Officially announced by Cyrus and NBC on June 26, 2014, and premiering on July 6, 2014, the two-hour special featured performances from her tour stops in Barcelona and Lisbon, Portugal, along with behind-the-scenes content focusing on aspects of the tour and her personal life. Regarding the decision to broadcast the special, NBC alternative programming president, Paul Telgedy  stated that it was to "offer an exclusive peek on how Cyrus engages with her crew and fans."

The special scored extremely low ratings; with 2 million viewers and a 0.7 share of the 18-49 demographic, Miley Cyrus: Bangerz Tour was the lowest-rated program of the night, and was beaten by new episodes of Reckless and Unforgettable on CBS, as well as a new episode of Rising Star on ABC; reruns aired over the Independence Day weekend by CBS, ABC, and Fox also contributed to the extremely low ratings. According to reports, the date chosen for the special's broadcast was not ideal, as Americans would not be watching television during the holiday weekend. However, it left a large impact on social networks, becoming a trending topic worldwide at various times of the night on Twitter. In August 2014, the Federal Communications Commission began to investigate three formal complaints surrounding the special, which argued that the special contained material inappropriate for broadcast television.

Bangerz Tour DVD 

The NBC television special was released on DVD and Blu-ray on March 23, 2015, by RCA Records.

Dominican Republic concert cancellation controversy 
On August 21, 2014, the Dominican Republic government commission that oversees public performances banned a September 13 concert in Santo Domingo on morality grounds. The commission said in a statement that it took the action because Cyrus often "undertakes acts that go against morals and customs, which are punishable by Dominican law." Daniel Papalia of Forbes commented that the "country's ruling may contradict this 'Diplomacy in Action' piece published by the US Bureau of Democracy, Human Rights, and Labor. The study states that as of 2008 there were no government restrictions on 'academic freedom or cultural events' in Dominican Republic, the terms academic and cultural leaving ample room for interpretation."

Set list 
This set list is representative of the performance in Vancouver. It is not representative of all concerts for the duration of the tour.

 "SMS (Bangerz)"
 "4x4"
 "Love Money Party"
 "My Darlin'"
 "Maybe You're Right"
 "FU"
 "Do My Thang"
 "GetItRight"
 "Can't Be Tamed"
 "Adore You"
 "Drive"
 "Rooting for My Baby"
 "Hey Ya!"
 "Jolene"
 "23"
 "On My Own"
 "Someone Else"
 "We Can't Stop"
 "Wrecking Ball"
Encore
 "Party in the U.S.A."

Tour dates

Notes

References 

2014 concert tours
Miley Cyrus concert tours